African D (Ɖ, ɖ) is a Latin letter representing the voiced retroflex plosive . It is a part of the African reference alphabet. It is mainly used by African languages such as Ewe, Fon, Aja, and Bassa. The African D should not be confused with either the eth (Ð, ð) of Icelandic, Faroese and Old English or with the D with stroke (Đ, đ) of Vietnamese, Serbo-Croatian and Sami languages. However, the upper-case forms of these letters tend to look the same.

The lower-case variant (ɖ, known as retroflex D, D with tail, or D with retroflex hook) is used to represent the voiced retroflex plosive in the International Phonetic Alphabet (but in the transcription of the languages of India, the same sound may be represented by a d with dot below: ḍ).

References 

Latin-script letters
Phonetic transcription symbols